Peng Xinwei 彭信威 (P'eng Hsin-wei) (1907–1967) was a Chinese economic historian, and author of  A Monetary History of China.

Life
Peng was born in Yantian, Xixiang, Jiangxi province, in 1907. After studying in Japan, he became a banker in Shanghai. His approach to economic history was influenced by the work of Carl Menger and Ludwig von Mises. Peng also taught at Fudan University in Shanghai. He died in 1967.

A Monetary History of China
This pioneering work is acclaimed internationally.

"It is a classic in the field of Chinese monetary history and numismatics" – Hans Ulrich Vogel, University of Tuebingen.

"His monumental two-volume work, A Monetary History of China, is much more than a history of money. It is a comprehensive history of Chinese economic thought." – William N. Goetzmann

 1954 "中国货币史" Zhongguo huobi shi  (Qunlian publishing house 群联出版社) 
 1958 "中国货币史" Zhongguo huobi shi  (Shanghai Renmin publishing house 上海人民出版社) 
 1965 "中国货币史" Zhongguo huobi shi  (Shanghai Renmin publishing house 上海人民出版社) 
 1994  A Monetary History of China (English translation by Edward H. Kaplan)

References

External links 
Peng Xinwei on Chinese Wikipedia 

People from Ji'an
Chinese numismatists
Republic of China economists
Historians from Jiangxi
1907 births
1967 deaths
People's Republic of China economists
Republic of China historians
People's Republic of China historians
Academic staff of Chongqing University
Academic staff of Fudan University
Educators from Jiangxi